Nikola Maravić (born July 31, 1989) is a Serbian professional basketball player for Avijeh Sanat Parsa Mashhad of the Iranian Basketball Super League.

Professional career
Maravić started his career in 2006 in Mega Vizura. He stayed in Mega until 2012. Then he signed with Vršac. On his debut for Vršac he scored 4 points in an 82–91 home defeat against Vojvodina. On August 23, 2013, he signed with Borac Čačak. On September 11, 2017, he signed with Levski Sofia.

References

External links 
 Profile at bgbasket.com
 Profile at realgm.com
 Profile at eurobasket.com

1989 births
Living people
Basketball players from Belgrade
Basketball League of Serbia players
BC Levski Sofia players
BC Zepter Vienna players
Centers (basketball)
KK Borac Čačak players
OKK Dunav players
KK Igokea players
KK Mega Basket players
KK Vršac players
Serbian expatriate basketball people in Austria
Serbian expatriate basketball people in Bosnia and Herzegovina
Serbian expatriate basketball people in Bulgaria
Serbian expatriate basketball people in Georgia (country)
Serbian expatriate basketball people in Iran
Serbian men's basketball players